Grand Pic de la Lauzière is a mountain of Savoie, France. It lies in the Lauzière massif range and has an elevation of 2,829 metres above sea level.

References

Mountains of Savoie
Mountains of the Alps